An optical transport network (OTN) is a digital wrapper that encapsulates frames of data, to allow multiple data sources to be sent on the same channel. This creates an optical virtual private network for each client signal.

ITU-T defines an optical transport network as a set of optical network elements (ONE) connected by optical fiber links, able to provide functionality of transport, multiplexing, switching, management, supervision and survivability of optical channels carrying client signals. An ONE may re-time, re-Amplify, re-shape (3R) but it does not have to be 3R it can be purely photonic. Unless connected by optical fibre links, it shall not be OTN. Mere functionality of switching, management, supervision shall not make it OTN, unless the signals are carried through optical fibre.

Comparing OTN and SONET/SDH

Standards

OTN was designed to provide higher throughput (currently 400G) than its predecessor SONET/SDH, which stops at 40Gbit/s, per channel.

ITU-T Recommendation G.709 is commonly called Optical Transport Network (OTN) (also called digital wrapper technology or optical channel wrapper). As of December 2009, OTN has standardized the following line rates.

The OTUk (k=1/2/2e/3/3e2/4) is an information structure into which another information structure called ODUk (k=1/2/2e/3/3e2/4) is mapped. The ODUk signal is the server layer signal for client signals. The following ODUk information structures are defined in ITU-T Recommendation G.709

Equipment
At a very high level, the typical signals processed by OTN equipment at the Optical Channel layer are:
SONET/SDH
Ethernet/FibreChannel
Packets
OTN

A few of the key functions performed on these signals are:
Protocol processing of all the signals:-
Mapping and de-mapping of non-OTN signals into and out of OTN signals
Multiplexing and de-multiplexing of OTN signals
Forward error correction (FEC) on OTN signals

Packet processing in conjunction with mapping/de-mapping of packet into and out of OTN signals

Switch Fabric
The OTN signals at all data-rates have the same frame structure but the frame period reduces as the data-rate increases. As a result, the Time-Slot Interchange (TSI) technique of implementing SONET/SDH switch fabrics is not directly applicable to OTN switch fabrics. OTN switch fabrics are typically implemented using Packet Switch Fabrics.

FEC Latency
On a point-to-point OTN link there is latency due to forward error correction (FEC) processing. Hamming distance of the RS(255,239) code is 17

See also
 G.709

References

External links
 Anritsu Poster - Details of all OTN areas including breakdown of the full frame
 Optical Transport Network (OTN) Tutorial, ITU-T, only covers G.709 (2003/03)
  Hot topics in Optical Transport Networks, Steve Trowbridge (Nokia), Chairman, ITU-T Study Group 15

 
ITU-T recommendations